Knud Jacobsen (26 May 1914 – 29 December 1987) was a Danish cyclist. He competed in the individual and team road race events at the 1936 Summer Olympics.

References

External links
 

1914 births
1987 deaths
Danish male cyclists
Olympic cyclists of Denmark
Cyclists at the 1936 Summer Olympics
Cyclists from Copenhagen